Baba Ghulam Shah Badshah University  is a State university in India which came into existence by the Act of the Jammu and Kashmir Legislative Assembly in 2002. The university is named after saint Baba Ghulam Shah Badshah. The university campus is located at the foothills of the great Himalayan Pir Panjal range in Rajouri,  from Jammu, the Winter capital &  from Srinagar, the Summer capital of Jammu and Kashmir union territory. It focuses on undergraduate engineering courses, a diverse postgraduate courses and research in fields such as management, environment, biodiversity, bio-technology, computer sciences, information technology, and applied mathematics. Akbar Masood was appointed as Vice Chancellor on 13 February 2021.

Schools of Studies
The university offers various undergraduate and postgraduate courses in the following schools of study
School of Mathematical & Computer Sciences
School of Material Sciences & Nanotechnology
School of Engineering & Technology
School of Management Studies
School of Biosciences & Biotechnology
School of Education 
School of Nursing & Biomedical Sciences 
School of Islamic Studies & Languages
School of Social Sciences

References

Universities in Jammu and Kashmir
Educational institutions established in 2002
2002 establishments in Jammu and Kashmir